Red Circle Coffee was a branded line of coffee sold by the American supermarket chain A&P, the middle tier of the company's  coffee trio.  Introduced in September, 1919 , it was bracketed by the exiting brands of  Bokar above and 8 O'Clock Coffee below it.

History
Historical research of A&P newspaper advertising from 1919 through the 1920s has provided the most insight into the composition of Red Circle as well as of 8 O’Clock and Bokar. 8 O’Clock was described in 1920s advertising as being straight ‘Santos’ coffee. This was particularly emphasized subsequent to the US Sesquicentennial Exposition hosted by the City of Philadelphia in 1926 and where A&P hosted a building with ‘Santos’ on top. 8 O’Clock was recognized with an award for excellence at the exposition, a fact emblazoned on the 8 O’Clock packaging itself through to the 1932 rebrand. Bokar is known to have consisted of a dark-roasted blend of Colombian coffees. Red Circle was described on numerous occasions of being a blend of Brazilian and Colombian coffees, and specifically on one occasion of a blend of Bogota and Santos. While the precise acceptable proportions of the two components of the blend may have been known only to George Hartford (“Mr. George”), changed with the seasons, and possibly lost in antiquity, study of documentation external to A&P gives some revealing insight as to the probable composition. Campbell states that a quality and distinctive restaurant coffee can be had by combining three parts Bogota with one part Santos. 

Over the years, Red Circle was primarily sold in A&P stores as whole bean and ground at the time and point of sale in the red Hobart grinders ubiquitous to A&P stores. In the 1960s and 1970s, Red Circle was also sold pre-ground and vacuum- sealed in steel cans.

In 1979, A&P licensed its division Compass Foods Inc. to sell Red Circle Coffee to other retailers, including competing supermarket chains. Compass Foods was subsequently spun-out from A&P and sold to a Private Equity buyer (Gryphon) in the 2000s then relatively quickly to its present owner, the Tata Group.

It is not known exactly when the Red Circle blend was discontinued by Compass Foods, though this is believed to have occurred on the mid-1990s.

Branding and packaging
The first generation package of Red Circle used the phrase ‘Specially Selected’ over the A&P ‘Circle’ logo, with the word Coffee beneath. In 1927, A&P applied for and received a trademark for the ‘Red Circle’ logo (US Trademark Reg. 0225007), which replaced the A&P Circle logo with the stylized words ‘Red Circle’. The logo again changed slightly prior to 1932 with a change to the font of the stylized words. In October, 1932, A&P standardized the appearance of the packaging of its Coffee Trio with a standard font that remains in use today by Tata for packaging Eight O’ Clock coffee. Eight O’Clock was packaged in a red bag, Bokar in a black bag, and Red Circle in a yellow bag. A stylized red circle was also retained on the label at this time. Minor changes were made to the branding since 1932, including the change and removal of descriptive text wording within the logo and the addition of the A&P ‘Circle’ logo in place of the Red Circle. The A&P Circle logo was removed around the time that A&P adopted the ‘Sunrise’ logo (mid 1970s) and prior to A&P's creation of the Compass Foods subsidiary.

External links

1933 newspaper advertisement mentions the Red Circle brand among other items

Coffee brands
Products introduced in 1919
The Great Atlantic & Pacific Tea Company